Juniperus rigida, the temple juniper, is a species of juniper, native to northern China, Mongolia, Korea, Japan, and the far southeast of Russia (Sakhalin and Primorsky Krai), occurring at altitudes of . The species is also naturalized in the United States (California and Alabama). It is closely related to Juniperus communis (common juniper) and Juniperus conferta (shore juniper), the latter sometimes treated as a variety or subspecies of J. rigida.

It is dioecious, with separate male and female plants. The seed cones are berry-like, green ripening in 18 months to dark purple or brownish with a variable whitish waxy coating; they are spherical, 5–9 mm diameter, and have three (rarely six) fused scales in one (rarely two) whorls of three, each with a single seed (when six scales, only the three larger scales with seeds). The seeds are dispersed when birds eat the cones, digesting the fleshy scales and passing the hard seeds in their droppings. The pollen cones are yellow, 3–5 mm long, and fall soon after shedding their pollen in spring.

It is grown as an ornamental tree, often planted in temple grounds in Japan. It is also often grown as bonsai.

Gallery

References

rigida
Flora of Eastern Asia
Flora of China
Flora of Mongolia
Flora of the Russian Far East
Plants described in 1846
Garden plants of Asia
Taxonomy articles created by Polbot
Dioecious plants